The Grand Prix is an annual award presented by the Belgian Film Critics Association (UCC).

It was introduced in 1954 by the organizing committee to honor the film of the year "that contributed the most to the enrichment and influence of cinema". In December of each year, the organization meets to vote for films released in the previous calendar year. To determine the nominations, ballots are sent in by the members – select knowledgeable film enthusiasts, academics, filmmakers, and journalists – and subsequently tabulated in order to decide the winner.

Winners and nominees
In the following lists, the first titles listed are winners. These are also in bold and; those not in bold are nominees.

1950s

1960s

1970s

1980s

1990s

2000s

2010s

2020s

References

External links
 

Belgian film awards
International film awards
Awards established in 1954
Lists of films by award